The following is a list of characters from the television series Freaks and Geeks.

Weirs

Lindsay Weir
Lindsay Weir, played by the American actress Linda Cardellini, is the eldest of the two Weir siblings and serves as the protagonist of the series Freaks and Geeks. In the show, she was a precocious teen who had a strong bond with her friend Millie Kentner. She pursued her scholastic career at McKinley High School with vigor and quickly established herself as a bright and thoughtful student, with exceptional academic achievements garnering recognition from her peers and teachers as well as being a standout member of the Mathletes.

After her grandmother's death, whom she considered the most upstanding and kindest person she had ever known, Lindsay begins to feel adrift, questioning the accepted norms of religion and social structures, which had previously given her a sense of purpose and security. She became an atheist after the last words her grandmother were that she saw "nothing” and that she was unhappy and afraid dying.

According to her brother, not long after this Lindsay started hanging out with the "burnouts" or "freaks," who are known for being rebellious and less academically focused, a far cry from the expectations of her family and old friends, including her friend Millie.

She starts out being intimidated by the group, seen as a poser by Kim Kelly and pushed into more and more risk taking by the rest of the group. Lindsay grows to understand their motives and how to stand up for herself and set boundaries while staying friends. Despite the drastically different lifestyle from what she was used to, she strives to remain the same person: intelligent, thoughtful, and resilient. Although her good intentions do not always turn out for the best, especially when Lindsay is out of her depth and does not first listen to those she wants to help. Throughout the series, she continues to challenge the status quo and find her place in the world.

Sam Weir
Samuel Harold Weir, portrayed by the American actor and film producer, John Francis Daley, is Lindsay Weir's younger brother. He is shorter and less physically developed than many of his peers and is often shy and timid when socializing with anyone other than his two closest friends and his family. With only a few exceptions, Sam usually sticks to manners and expectations that are consistent with the conventional middle class American values held by his family.

He finds solace in the common interests he has with his close friends Bill and Neal. They enjoy the comedy of Bill Murray and Steve Martin and TV shows like Saturday Night Live together and debate the merits of different science fiction universes. These interests combined with difficulty with social interaction has left Sam and his friends being labelled as "geeks." 

Even though Sam enjoys his friends and the acceptance they give him, Sam yearns to be seen as something more than a geek and to be respected by the popular kids. He struggles to get rid of his geeky persona while trying to impress his school crush, Cindy Sanders. Even when his efforts are successful, it is usually short-lived and at a cost to his personal integrity and long standing friendships. 

Sam and his friends are often bullied by other students like Alan White and his friends, Karen Scarfolli, and for a time Kim Kelly. 

Sam was selected as the son for "The Perfect TV Family" by Entertainment Weekly.

Harold Weir
Harold “Fiscal” Weir—played by Joe Flaherty—is the head of the Weir household. Harold is usually stern and strict but is also a loving father who intends to look out for the best interests of his children. 

Though Harold is frequently yelling at the dinner table about bad role models and dealing out sometimes unreasonable punishments, he has a good sense of humor and enjoys seeing his family happy. 

He owns and works at A1 Sporting Goods store, a small local business. Business is generally good, but he is worried about the possible impact that megastores will have. 

Harold's biggest concern with his children. He believes Lindsay is falling in with a bad crowd, and he has a strong distaste for her "burnout friends" although he later takes a shine to Nick after he gets kicked out of his house, by letting him stay at the Weirs' house and encourages him to practice drumming. Harold tells Lindsay that he is more helpful to Nick than to her because he expects more from her, and says that Nick's father is a "hard man" who reminds him of his own dad. It is also strongly implied that Harold's father physically abused him. 

It is shown often that he is very proud of Lindsay for her intelligence and maturity and Sam for his kindness and morals. In the episode "Girlfriends and Boyfriends", Harold reveals to Lindsay that he lost his virginity to a prostitute while he was a soldier in Korea. Harold regrets that his first time was not special and comments that it was the "worst five dollars I've ever spent". He does not reflect on the feelings of the prostituted woman or girl in a nation at war, with a history of war-time sexual exploitation.

Jean Weir
Jean Weir, portrayed by Becky Ann Baker, is a devoted mother and wife who often overlooks her own needs for the sake of the Weirs.

She provides for her family, especially when it comes to making meals and ensuring her kids' well-being, as well as giving them guidance and advice whenever they need it, even though sometimes she is oblivious to the issues her children are facing. They gather around the dinner table every evening and engage in meaningful conversation, something Jean cherishes deeply.

Despite rarely receiving the appreciation she deserves for her efforts, Jean is an incredibly kind and generous person who is always willing to lend a helping hand and show support for her family.

Although she is also concerned about the new friends Lindsay has made, she is tolerant and compassionate toward them. In particular, she allows Kim Kelly to stay over for dinner when it is clear Kim is emotionally distraught from her relationship problems and difficult home life.

Freaks

Daniel Desario
Daniel Desario—played by James Franco—is a cool and charismatic burnout. Daniel is usually known at McKinley High School for doing one of two things: being with his girlfriend Kim Kelly and/or skipping class. He is somewhat selfish and very manipulative but often pulls through to help his friends, and is the leader of the freaks. Daniel hides the fact that he is eighteen years old and has been held back two grades in school. Also, Daniel plays guitar. His rebellious and anarchistic view of society often lead him into trouble. Though he is socially confident and acts apathetic towards his schoolwork, Daniel is secretly insecure about the fact that he does not do well in school, and doesn't think he is smart enough to succeed. Daniel has an older brother who is a drug addict, and lives with his two parents; he is taking care of his (never seen) father, who is an invalid, and his mother is an understandably stressed-out wreck who has no confidence in his scholastic abilities, once saying she wouldn't much mind if he dropped out of school altogether and began working a "crummy" minimum-wage job to bring cash home to the family.

Nick Andopolis
Nick Andopolis—played by Jason Segel—is a member of the gang of freaks. He is friendly, mild-mannered, and kind, offsetting the somewhat caustic sense of humor that some of his friends share. Nick frequently uses marijuana; he was once a basketball player (a part of his backstory that comes from real life, as Segel was a star on his high school team) but was kicked off his team for drug possession. These days, Nick's overwhelming passion is music - more specifically, his 29-piece drum kit. Much to the objection of Nick's strict military father, Nick practices drumming frequently, usually neglecting schoolwork in the process and eventually leading his dad to simply sell off the entire drum set. Nick also has a tendency to smother his girlfriends with too much affection, which Lindsay Weir discovers firsthand after they begin dating.

Ken Miller
Ken Miller—played by Seth Rogen—is wise-cracking and sarcastic. Whenever Ken opens his mouth, it is usually to let out a biting quip at the expense of someone around him. He has been friends with Daniel Desario since elementary school and later develops a relationship with Amy Andrews. He is very stubborn and doesn't back down from fights (in one episode, when asked if "he wants to go," he replies "I always wanna go!" as well as moshing enthusiastically in "Noshing and Moshing"). He is also very smart, considering the kind of people he hangs out with. At the party in episode 2, he quickly catches on when the beer is switched with non-alcoholic beer, but instead of telling everybody, he decided to make some money in the game of quarters ($87.00, in total). He is shown to have a softer side in the later episodes of the series, particularly in his relationship with "tuba girl" Amy, who matches him wit for wit, prompting Ken to fall for her. In episode 17, it is revealed that Ken's parents are very wealthy and that he was raised by a nanny. He also says his post-high school plans involve inheriting his father's business when he dies, selling it off for a huge profit, and retiring to Hawaii.

Kim Kelly
Kim Kelly—played by Busy Philipps—is Daniel's on-and-off girlfriend throughout the series. Kim is a tough, short-tempered girl and is known by the other students for having sex, doing drugs and being tough in a fight.

She is often at odds with Daniel, usually accusing him of infidelity, sometimes with good cause, causing their relationship to be in constant disarray. However, despite their relationship troubles, over the course of the show the two stay together and so demonstrate attraction and affection for one another.

Kim was originally dismissive and mean toward Lindsay and was reluctant to allow her to hang out in their group. She rightly notes that Lindsay is from a more affluent background than herself or Daniel, and is new to acting like a “freak” in terms of how she dresses and acts. Kim interprets this as Lindsay being a poser and untrustworthy. However, as the series progresses, the two eventually forge a strong friendship backed up by loyalty and empathy for each other. By the end of the series, Kim and Lindsay were best friends and spent most of their free time together. 

Kim lives with her disapproving mother, her illiterate stepfather, and her brother, a peculiar young man named Chip who sleeps on the living room couch. Kim claims he has brain damage from having been attacked by police and clubbed in the head. He appears to sleep all the time. She doesn't get along with her parents, who criticize her for not getting good grades and for the company she keeps. Her parents frequently devolve into screaming matches with each other and Kim, often on edge from living in poverty in a house in a state of disrepair. One major conflict occurs when Kim’s parents try to take away her car. They view the car as rightly belonging to the family, to let Kim use or sell if they want. Kim says her aunt — her mother’s sister — specifically gave it to her when she died of a cocaine overdose.

Geeks

Bill Haverchuck
Bill Haverchuck—played by Martin Starr is the geekiest of the geek gang. Bill is tall for his age, skinny and wears large glasses. Bill is unpretentious and somewhat immature, with an understated but hilarious sense of humor. He remains the most mild-mannered and introverted of the three Geeks. He occasionally makes keen observations of other characters, usually in speaking to Sam and Neal. In addition to being a loyal friend, Bill is an avid fan of the television soap opera Dallas. He lives with his single mother Gloria “Glandeco” Haverchuck. He is extremely allergic to peanuts and almost dies after Alan White plants some of them in his sandwich as a prank in the episode "Chokin' and Tokin'. The reason for his serious medical problems is explained in the episode with his mother explaining how she used drugs and alcohol while pregnant with Bill.

Neal Schweiber
Neal Schweiber—played by Samm Levine—is a self-proclaimed comic genius and ladies' man. Unlike Sam and Bill, Neal is usually very outgoing and often wants to be the center of attention. He is Jewish, and humorously notes that he was once elected treasurer of his class when "I didn't even run!" He has an unrequited crush on Lindsay, and is dismayed (in Noshing and Moshing) when he sees her kissing his older, college-student brother Barry. He has an abundant amount of confidence and charisma, though it garners him no more respect or reputation than Sam or Bill. Neal is somewhat in denial that he is just as geeky as the rest of his friends. His father is a dentist and his mother a homemaker. His family is fairly well-to-do. Early in the series, Sam and Bill thought Neal's father was "cool" because he enjoyed the same TV shows they did and shared a similar sense of humor, but their opinions of him–as well as Neal's–changed when they discovered he was having an affair. He and Bill are supportive of Sam when he decides to break up with Cindy.

Other students
 Natasha Melnick as Cindy Sanders, Sam's crush and a popular cheerleader. Sam and Cindy are strictly friends for most of the series. Sam tries many different things to get Cindy's attention, but all it does is bring them closer as friends. Cindy begins dating Todd Schellinger, the star basketball player, but it does not go well, and Sam is often Cindy's go-to person to vent about her frustrations with Todd. After their breakup, Cindy tells Bill that she likes Sam as more than a friend. After a few dates, Sam finds Cindy to be boring, shallow, egotistical, and rude, as well as annoyingly political about her Republican beliefs (Sam isn't particularly political but dislikes the coldness and snobbery that's front and center in Cindy's conservative views). He decides they should stop dating in the show's penultimate episode, which upsets Cindy.
 Sarah Hagan as Millie Kentner, Lindsay's geeky and highly religious former best friend and next door neighbor. During the first half of the series, Millie struggles to keep Lindsay on the right track. She often looks out for her, like attending Lindsay's keg party to make sure everyone is safe. She also assists Lindsay in babysitting when Lindsay was too high on marijuana to function. Millie feels sorry for Lindsay because of her loss of faith. One night, Kim and Lindsay depart the Weir house and believe they ran over a squirrel. The next day at school, they learn from Millie that her lifelong pet dog, Goliath, had been killed by a hit-and-run right in front of Millie's house. A panicked Kim and Lindsay believe they were responsible for Goliath's death. Kim befriends Millie out of pity and also relates to Millie's situation. After Millie changes her attitude and clothing, starts rebelling against her parents and even yells at her mother to go away and leave her alone, Kim and Lindsay begin to grow worried. It wasn't until Millie was about to drink her first beer when Kim admits she killed Goliath. Millie and Lindsay leave together and go back to Lindsay's house to listen to records, confirming they will remain friends. Millie is not seen in the series after that.
 Jerry Messing as Gordon Crisp, a friend of the geeks. Despite being overweight and having chronic body odor from trimethylaminuria, Gordon tends to be optimistic and take things in stride. Gordon was assigned to be Sam's lab partner in the beginning of the series. We learn that Gordon also likes sci-fi and shows intelligence. Sam admits to Gordon he didn't want to be his partner, but would rather be with Cindy Sanders. Gordon doesn't seem surprised and begins to give Sam very helpful advice to get with Cindy, and Sam decides Gordon is a good guy and begins inviting him to join the geeks on their activities. Gordon always has a positive thing to say even in the most negative or embarrassing situations, e.g. encouraging Bill that no one picks him first in softball because they're afraid of him, complimenting Sam's Parisian nightsuit, suggesting places for Sam and Cindy's first date, and convincing Daniel he would enjoy playing Dungeons & Dragons because "you can pretend to be someone you'd never get to be in real life". Gordon is aware of his big size and agrees with Harris when he says that "the world loves jolly, fat guys."
 Stephen Lea Sheppard as Harris Trinsky, a calm and sensible 15-year-old who gives good advice to the other students. Harris is the guru of the Geeks (and occasionally some of the Freaks). He is full of wisdom and accepts everyone for who they are, and often thinks the best of them, even the Freaks. He talks to Sam and his friends about how to fight off Alan the bully, as well as advising them how to act around girls. Later, when Daniel asks him "Am I a loser?", Harris quips that Daniel isn't a loser because he has sex, but if he wasn't having sex, it would definitely be debatable. He also finds ways to affirm Daniel outside of his insecurities, such as musing that Daniel would make a great Dungeons & Dragons player. Daniel surprises Harris by thanking him, and also compliments Harris's happy-with-himself approach to life. Harris is often seen with a Dungeons & Dragons book, and is also the Dungeon Master, much to Bill's dismay. Harris has a girlfriend named Judith throughout the show, whom he often talks about even though she is only seen once. Harris is sarcastic in a dry way, and is well aware of it. 
 Chauncey Leopardi as Alan White, the bully who torments Sam, Neal, and Bill; the reason is revealed in "Chokin' and Tokin'" after he nearly kills Bill in a practical joke gone wrong: he secretly enjoys science fiction and comic books, but was rejected by the geeks in his efforts to befriend them when they were younger. After mending fences with Bill, Alan is shown passing to Bill in basketball, despite Bill's lack of athleticism, and also calls Bill "the King" because he walked out of Coach Fredricks' class after insulting the coach.
 Joanna García as Vicki Appleby, the domineering head cheerleader. Throughout most of the series, Vicki is short-tempered and impatient with everyone around her. However, Vicki shows her nice side in rare moments, such as talking to Eli about Three's Company and showing compassion over Bill's coma. When Bill and Vicki were stuck in a closet playing "Seven Minutes in Heaven", she was her typical (rude) self until Bill angrily told her she was a jerk for assuming he wanted to kiss her or have anything to do with her in the first place. Vicki apologized and surprised herself and Bill by having a nice conversation with him about The Jerk, then happily kissing him (after swearing him to secrecy, of course).
 Riley Smith as Todd Schellinger, Cindy's jock boyfriend. Todd is introduced as a mildly mysterious character. At first, you only see him through Sam or Cindy's eyes from a distance. It wasn't until Sam became a mascot that we see Todd and Cindy kiss. Later in the episode, Todd is shown to be a nice person, talking to Sam as if they were friends. After Todd and Cindy break up and Cindy and Sam began dating, Todd demonstrates that he is a good guy when he bluntly tells Cindy he likes Sam, thinks he's cool and isn't going to fight Sam. This comes after Cindy tries to manipulate Todd and Sam into a battle for her affections.
 Kayla Ewell as Maureen Sampson, a transfer student to William McKinley High School since her family moved from Florida to Michigan. ("Carded and Discarded") Maureen befriends Sam, Neal, and Bill, and the three of them show Maureen around the school. The Geeks all like Maureen as she is cute, nice, personable, and enjoys spending time with them. Midway through "Carded and Discarded", Sam, Neal, and Bill try to stop Maureen from talking to Vicki out of concern that Maureen will join her and the other cheerleaders. By the end of the episode, Maureen has joined the popular kids. She invites Sam, Neal and Bill to hang out with her and her new friends, but they decline. Maureen is shown again in the episode "Chokin' and Tokin'" when Bill goes into a coma, showing compassion and worrying over Bill's health. There was a very minor subplot in that episode showing Sam starting to like Maureen, but it never resurfaced. Maureen also appears in a cameo in "Smooching and Mooching" where she is firmly in the popular camp, but never comes across as anything other than friendly.
 Shaun Weiss as Sean. Sean is one of the Freaks. He plays bass in Creation (Daniel, Nick, and Ken's band). Sean works at a fast food restaurant where he generally gives his friends free food as long as they buy a drink. Sean can be boorish and grating, but also seems to be somewhat of a diplomat among the students, hanging out with different cliques.
 Jarrett Lennon as Colin, Harris's best friend. ("Pilot Episode") Colin is first shown at Harris's sidekick, but later shown on his own as a hardcore drama student. He auditioned for school mascot with Sam, later exclaiming that Sam only won the role because of politics.
 Lizzy Caplan as Sara. Sara is shown throughout the series as a disco-loving girl who has a crush on Nick. In the series finale, the two begin dating and she drags him into the disco world. The Freaks are shocked by this because of Nick's verbal hatred of disco throughout the series. While they are practicing disco dancing, Sara tells Nick she thinks he still has feelings for Lindsay. Nick assures her he doesn't (although it's clear he still does). Nick and Sara are still together when the series ends, although Sara doesn't realize (or admit) Nick is not happy with her, and that his self-improvement steps during their relationship were likely a fruitless attempt to reunite with Lindsay.
 Mark Allan Staubach as Mark, a goofy guy who occasionally hangs out with the Freaks. He supplies pot to Nick in "Chokin' and Tokin'".
 Jessica Campbell as Amy Andrews ("Tuba Girl"). Amy is a "friend of a friend" to Lindsay. She is in marching band but is not quite a geek. Amy has a sharp tongue and a sarcastic sense of humor that instantly attracts fellow Freak, Ken. The two begin dating and grow very close. Amy eventually tells Ken she is an intersex woman. Although her specific condition is not mentioned, the most common intersex condition is late onset congenital adrenal hyperplasia, which is symptomatic in female people.  Ken is shocked and feels very uncomfortable at first, which initially creates a rift between the two of them. However, after ruminating about these insecurities with the other boys (at various points Nick, Daniel, and Sam), Ken later tells Amy he is sorry for his doubts and he doesn't care. They make up and are still together when the show ends.
 Ben Foster as Eli, a mentally disabled student who believes Three's Company is the greatest show ever. Lindsay sees some students picking on Eli right after asking two girls to the Homecoming Dance. Lindsay stands up for Eli and asks him to the dance.  However, later that day, Lindsay insterts herself into a conversation between Eli and two other students, attempting to convince Eli that they were laughing at him — not with him. While this was true, it did disrupt what was otherwise a happy time for Eli. In the process Lindsay also refers to him as “retarded”, something which clearly upsets Eli, who calls himself “special”. Even though Lindsay didn't mean it in a disparaging or hateful way, the interaction ends badly. Eli tells Lindsay he hates her and he doesn't want to go to the dance with her. He then runs away down a set of bleachers, slips and falls, and breaks his arm.  Lindsay apologizes to Eli at the dance, he forgives her, and they dance together.
 Jason Schwartzman as Howie Gelfand. ("Carded and Discarded") Howie is an older guy who works retail at a clothing shop. He supplies the freaks fake IDs to get into a show at a bar.
 Shawn Soong as Stroker, a friend of the Freaks. He has very long wavy hair and appears in nearly every episode, but is rarely seen talking.
 Shia LaBeouf as Herbert, the school mascot who wore the McKinley Vikings helmet until he broke his arm and Sam replaced him, later falling into a deep sleep because his misguided mother refused to let him sleep at home out of fear he'd lapse into a post-concussion coma. ("We've Got Spirit")
 Rashida Jones as Karen Scarfoli, Kim's "friend" who bullies Sam by graffiting his locker and writing "Pygmy Geek" in huge letters. She does this while “on the warpath” (looking for a fight) after her boyfriend Ricky (unseen) broke up with her. ("Kim Kelly is My Friend"), but after Kim is won over by Lindsay, Karen gets her own nasty locker ink in retaliation for having fooling around with Kim's boyfriend, Daniel.
 Alex Breckenridge as Shelley Weaver, the head Mathlete whom Lindsay is determined to humiliate for spreading false rumors about Kim, and who later freezes and embarrasses herself at a competition where Lindsay's brilliance wins the day. ("Looks and Books")
 Samaire Armstrong as Laurie, a Deadhead. 
 Renee Cohen as Judith, Harris Trinsky's girlfriend. She only has one on-air appearance, where she says, "Oh, Harris! You're so bad," before kissing him. Judith has particular tastes, liking (according to her boyfriend) scented oils and plenty of time with Harris. They are a very affectionate couple.

School staff
 Dave "Gruber" Allen as Jeffrey "Jeff" Theodore Rosso, the hippie guidance counselor who often serves as a confidant to the main characters. His attempts to appear "cool and hip" often make him seem stupid, and he is shown to occasionally use his position in authoritarian or otherwise inappropriate ways. Nevertheless, he genuinely cares for the students, often identifying their problems and offering cogent advice in an upbeat manner. It was revealed in a conversation with Lindsay that he contracted herpes from a woman he met at a bar and also stated that he had sex in a van at Woodstock. He also discusses his anti-war protesting history when he was a student at UC Berkeley, and ends up giving career guidance advice to an unhappy Secret Service agent (played by Ben Stiller). In the episode "Carded and Discarded," it is revealed that Rosso is lead vocalist for a local bar band, "Feedback."
 Tom Wilson as Coach Benjamin "Ben" Fredricks, the PE and Health teacher. Though gruff and a bit of a meathead to the geek characters, he can be friendly and seems to be happy in the rare instances when the geeks succeed in class. He is later shown to be dating Bill's mother and goes to great lengths to win Bill's acceptance.
 Steve Bannos as Frank Kowchevski, a petty, unpleasant, hot-headed math teacher who has it out for the freak characters, particularly Daniel. He is also the coach of the McKinley Mathletes group. In a deleted scene for the episode "The Little Things," it is revealed that Kowchevski is gay. He is also a Vietnam veteran and his hatred for Daniel comes from seeing him as "one of the guys who will get you killed" when he was in Vietnam.
 Leslie Mann as Miss Foote, the social studies teacher. When Bill is rushed to the hospital for a severe allergy attack, she can be seen comforting him on his way to the ambulance, as well as visiting him in the hospital.
 Trace Beaulieu as Hector LaCovara, the science teacher.
 Steve Higgins as Mr. Fleck, the A/V teacher who is well liked by the geeks. He advises the boys on the high school hierarchy and how the lives will turn out for the jocks who bully them.

Other family members
 Sam McMurray as Dr. Vic Schweiber, Neal's father. He is initially liked by Neal, Sam, and Bill as he shares their sense of humor and television program favorites. However, they later discover he is cheating on his wife, Neal's mother Lydia, whom he met in college. This news upsets Neal ("The Garage Door").
 Mike White as Chip Kelly, Kim's alcoholic older brother who was attacked by the police when he was minding his own business and now sleeps on the couch all day because of, according to his mother, "water on the brain." ("The Diary")
 Claudia Christian as Gloria Haverchuck, Bill's mother. She raises Bill alone and works as a waitress. She previously worked as a dancer. Gloria blames herself for Bill's many medical problems, hinting that she took drugs and alcohol while pregnant with him. She cares for Bill very much and works hard to give him a good life. ("Chokin' & Tokin'" and "Dead Dogs and Gym Teachers")
 Kevin Tighe as Col. Andopolis, Nick's dad. He is very strict and dislikes his son's so-called musical ambitions. ("Smooching and Mooching")
 David Krumholtz as Barry Schweiber, Neal's charismatic older brother. He is well liked by the group and Neal looks up to him. He attends college in Wisconsin and hasn't chosen a major yet. Although he claims to have been a bigger geek than Neal in high school, he tells Lindsay that he reinvented himself as "the handsome, dashing Jew" once he got on campus. Lindsay is attracted to him and kisses him enthusiastically at his family's party (to the dismay of Neal). ("Noshing and Moshing")
 Amy Aquino as Mrs. Lydia Schweiber, Neal's mom. She is aware of her husband's infidelities and comforts her son by telling him that she has only a few years left with him as her child at home, and plenty of time to deal with her husband in future years. ("The Garage Door"; "Noshing and Moshing")
 Ann Dowd as Cookie Kelly, Kim's mom. ("Kim Kelly is My Friend" and "The Diary") She is depicted as stressed out by the living conditions in their home, her son’s catatonic state, and her daughter’s low grades. Rather than empathize with or bond with her daughter, she becomes suspicious, harsh and critical of her.

References

Characters
Freaks and Geeks